Bjarne Eriksen is the name of:

 Bjarne Eriksen (businessman) (1886–1976), Norwegian businessperson and Olympic fencer
 Bjarne Eriksen (painter) (1882–1970), Norwegian painter